Leocadio is a surname. Notable people with the surname include:
Paolo da San Leocadio (1447–1520), Italian painter
Antonio Leocadio Guzmán (1801–1884), Venezuelan politician, journalist, military leader and father of Antonio Guzmán Blanco
Pedro de Alcântara João Carlos Leopoldo Salvador Bibiano Francisco Xavier de Paula Leocádio Miguel Gabriel Rafael Gonzaga (1825–1891), full name of Pedro II of Brazil, Brazilian monarch